The 2019 Tauranga mayoral election was part of the New Zealand local elections that were 12 October 2019 to elect the Mayor of Tauranga. It was won by Tenby Powell who defeated the incumbent mayor Greg Brownless.

Key dates
Key dates for the election were:

1 July: Electoral Commission enrolment campaign started.
19 July: Nominations opened for candidates. Rolls opened for inspection.
16 August: Nominations closed at 12 noon. Rolls closed.
21 August: Election date and candidates' names announced.
20 to 25 September: Voting documents delivered to households. Electors could post the documents back to electoral officers as soon as they have voted.
12 October: Polling day. Voting documents needed to be at council before voting closes at 12 noon. Preliminary results were available as soon as all ordinary votes are counted.
17 to 23 October: Official results, including all valid ordinary and special votes, declared.

Candidates

Declared candidates
Greg Brownless, incumbent mayor
Kelvin Clout, deputy mayor
Murray Guy, former city councillor
Andrew Hollis
Jos Nagels
Tenby Powell, businessman
John Robson, city councillor
Christopher Stokes
RangiMarie TeAmopui-Kaa Kingi
Les Wallen, pastor

Withdrawn candidates
Danny Cancian, property developer
Dame Susan Devoy , former Race Relations Commissioner and squash champion

Result 
Tenby Powell won the election to become mayor of Tauranga, with 17,299 votes over Brownless' 12,400 in the final STV iteration.

References

2019 elections in New Zealand
Mayoral elections in New Zealand
October 2019 events in New Zealand